Warriors – Ratnici, unofficially known as Love Machine, is the 1983 debut EP released by Yugoslav/Canadian heavy metal band Warriors.

Background
Warriors were formed in 1982 by vocalist Dušan Nikolić and drummer Miroslav "Vicko" Milatović and were originally named Ratnici (Serbo-Croatian for Warriors). Milatović was at the time a member of highly successful band Riblja Čorba, Ratnici being his side project. The first lineup of the band also featured guitarist Dragan Deletić, guitarist Zoran Konjević and bass guitarist Slobodan Svrdlan (a former member of the band Gordi). In 1983 the band released their debut EP with four songs, two of them with English and two with Serbo-Croatian language lyrics, through Yugoslav record label PGP-RTB. The songs "Love Machine" and "Kad me ljubiš" ("When You Kiss Me") feature the same composition but in different mix, which is also the case with "I Am Alive" and "Skiti tu ploču" ("Stop That Record").

Shortly after the EP release, Milatović had to leave the band due to his mandatory stint in the Yugoslav People's Army, the EP being the only Warriors release with him on drums. Warriors – Ratnici was also the band's only release recorded with Deletić, who was shortly after the EP release replaced by Canadian guitarist Douglass Platt.

Cover art
The cover art, designed by Zoran Blažina, was (with a modified Warriors logo) later used as a cover for the band's second full-length album, Warriors.

Track listing

Personnel
Dušan Nikolić - vocals
Zoran Konjević - guitar
Dragan Deletić - guitar
Slobodan Svrdlan - bass guitar
Miroslav Milatović - drums

Legacy
In 2021 the songs "Love Machine" and "Skini tu ploču" were ranked 44th and 51st respectively on the list of 100 Greatest Yugoslav Hard & Heavy Anthems by web magazine Balkanrock.

References

Warriors – Ratnici at Discogs

External links
Warriors – Ratnici at Discogs

Warriors (band) albums
1983 debut EPs
Serbian-language albums
PGP-RTB EPs